Samantha is an unincorporated community in Highland County, in the U.S. state of Ohio.

History
Samantha was laid out in 1845, and was named after the first local girl whom the founders would encounter while deciding upon a suitable name.  A post office called Beesons Store was established in 1836, the name was changed to Samantha in 1848, and the post office closed in 1867.

References

Unincorporated communities in Highland County, Ohio
Unincorporated communities in Ohio